Einsamkeit (German for Loneliness, Solitude) is the second studio album by a German dark wave band Lacrimosa. It was released in 1992.

History
All music and lyrics for all songs were written by Tilo Wolff. The album was recorded in 1992 at the Sodom & Gomorra studio in Binningen, Switzerland and released on Tilo Wolff's own independent label Hall of Sermon. It is the first album which featured a full band of session musicians. The cover art was created by Stelio Diamantopoulos, who drew the cover artwork for the first album (as well as all the subsequent studio albums), and who also played the bass on this album.

Releases
The album was originally released on CD and LP in Switzerland in 1992. 
In 2020 a new version of the title track appeared on the band's YouTube channel. Tilo Wolff published a recording of a new arrangement of the 1992 song to cheer up his fans during the COVID-19 pandemic.

Track listing

Personnel
Tilo Wolff - vocals, piano, keyboards, synthesizers, drums, music, lyrics, artwork concept
Stelio Diamantopoulos - bass, artwork
Philippe Alioth - keyboards, mastering
Roland Thaler - guitars
Eric The Phantom - violin

References

External links
 Album lyrics at Darklyrics.com
 

Lacrimosa (band) albums
1992 albums